Jim Amos or James Amos may refer to:

 James E. Amos (1879–1953), bodyguard to U.S. President Theodore Roosevelt and Federal Bureau of Investigation agent
 Jim Amos (rugby league) (1907–1981), New Zealand rugby league player and coach
 James Amos (sailor) (born 1936), Bermudian Olympic competitor
 James F. Amos (born 1946), United States Marine Corps general

See also
Jim Amoss (born 1947), American journalist